Johann Sebastian Bach composed the church cantata  (Lord Jesus Christ, O highest good), 113 in Leipzig for the eleventh Sunday after Trinity and first performed it on 20 August 1724. The chorale cantata is based on the hymn "" by Bartholomäus Ringwaldt (1588).

History and words 

Bach composed the cantata in Leipzig for the Eleventh Sunday after Trinity as part of his second cantata cycle and first performed it on 20 August 1724. The prescribed readings for the Sunday were from the First Epistle to the Corinthians, on the gospel of Christ and his (Paul's) duty as an apostle, and from the Gospel of Luke, the parable of the Pharisee and the Tax Collector.

The text of the cantata is based on the eight stanzas of Bartholomäus Ringwaldt's hymn (1588), a song of penitence related to the tax collector's prayer "" (God be merciful to me a sinner). The melody is also attributed to Ringwaldt. An unknown poet kept the words unchanged in movements 1, 2, 4 and 8, but inserted recitative in the fourth movement. He transcribed the ideas of the remaining stanzas to arias and a recitative, retaining the beginning of stanzas 3 and 7. He treated stanzas 5 and 6 most freely, including ideas from the epistle such as the promise of mercy, which is only asked, not promised, in the chorale. The last verse also appears in Handel's Messiah, turned in the third person: "Come unto Him, all ye that labour", in the soprano section of He shall feed His flock like a shepherd.

Scoring and structure 

The cantata in eight movements is for four vocal soloists (soprano, alto, tenor, and bass), a four-part choir, and a Baroque instrumental ensemble of two oboes d'amore, flauto traverso, two violins, viola and basso continuo.

 Chorus: 
 Chorale (alto): 
 Aria (bass): 
 Recitative + Chorale (bass): 
 Aria (tenor): 
 Recitative (tenor): 
 Aria (soprano, alto): 
 Chorale:

Music 
The opening chorus is a chorale fantasia in B minor with the cantus firmus in the soprano, the lower voices set in homophony contrasting with an embellished melody in the soprano. The lines of the chorale are separated by an independent ritornello of the orchestra. Its theme is derived from the chorale melody. A solo violin in virtuoso figuration plays throughout, while the oboes and the other strings are silent during the vocal passages. The second movement treats the chorale in the same way as some of the movements which Bach transcribed to the Schübler Chorales, as a trio of the alto, the violins in unison, and the continuo. Here the chorale melody appears unadorned.

The first aria is accompanied by the two oboes d'amore. The theme is related to the chorale melody, but turned to the major mode and in a swinging 12/8-time. The voice picks up the same theme and elaborates the word "" (changed) in an extended coloratura. Musicologist Boyd notes a similarity to the aria  from Bach's later Mass in B minor, both are for the bass, in a compound time, in A major and with two oboes. The second aria, movement 5, is accompanied by an obbligato flute, as in the cantatas of the two preceding weeks, Was frag ich nach der Welt, BWV 94, and Nimm von uns, Herr, du treuer Gott, BWV 101. The recitative, movement 6, is accompanied by the strings, after four movements without them. They enter in the second measure on the words "" (how sweetly this word rings in my ears!), called a "magical moment" by Craig Smith. The recitative culminates in the prayer of the tax collector. The last aria is set for two voices and continuo, concentrated on the words without ritornellos like a chorale concerto of the 17th century. The chorale melody in embellished form appears in several lines, even on words other than the original text. The final stanza is set for four parts.

Recordings 
 Die Bach Kantate Vol. 48, Helmuth Rilling, Gächinger Kantorei, Bach-Collegium Stuttgart, Arleen Augér, Gabriele Schreckenbach, Adalbert Kraus, Niklaus Tüller, Hänssler 1973
 J. S. Bach: Das Kantatenwerk – Sacred Cantatas Vol. 6, Gustav Leonhardt, Knabenchor Hannover, Collegium Vocale Gent, Leonhardt-Consort, soloist of the Knabenchor Hannover, René Jacobs, Kurt Equiluz, Max van Egmond, Teldec 1981
 Bach Edition Vol. 4 – Cantatas Vol. 1, conductor Pieter Jan Leusink, Holland Boys Choir, Netherlands Bach Collegium, Ruth Holton, Sytse Buwalda, Knut Schoch, Bas Ramselaar, Brilliant Classics 1999
 J. S. Bach: Complete Cantatas Vol. 11, Ton Koopman, Amsterdam Baroque Orchestra & Choir, Sibylla Rubens, Annette Markert, Christoph Prégardien, Klaus Mertens, Antoine Marchand 1999
 J. S. Bach: Trinity Cantatas II, John Eliot Gardiner, Monteverdi Choir, English Baroque Soloists, Magdalena Kožená, William Towers, Mark Padmore, Stephan Loges, Soli Deo Gloria 2000
 J. S. Bach: Cantatas Vol. 24 – Cantatas from Leipzig 1724, Masaaki Suzuki, Bach Collegium Japan, Yukari Nonoshita, Robin Blaze, Gerd Türk, Peter Kooy, BIS 2002

References

Sources 
 
 
 Cantata BWV 113 Herr Jesu Christ, du höchstes Gut history, scoring, sources for text and music, translations to various languages, discography, discussion, Bach Cantatas Website
 BWV 113 Herr Jesu Christ, du höchstes Gut English translation, University of Vermont
 BWV 113 Herr Jesu Christ, du höchstes Gut text, scoring, University of Alberta
 Luke Dahn: BWV 113.8 bach-chorales.com

Church cantatas by Johann Sebastian Bach
1724 compositions
Chorale cantatas